The inaugural Victorian Football League (VFL) season in 1897 saw 284 players make their senior debut for the eight clubs that comprised the VFL. Many of these players previously played for their clubs in the Victorian Football Association (VFA) prior to the establishment of the VFL.

Summary

Debuts

References

Australian rules football records and statistics
Australian rules football-related lists
1897 in Australian rules football